Bezirk Krems-Land is a district of the state of Lower Austria in Austria. It comprises the areas to the West and North of the city Krems an der Donau, which itself is a statutory city.

Municipalities
Suburbs, hamlets and other subdivisions of a municipality are indicated in small characters.
 Aggsbach
 Aggsbach Markt, Groisbach Köfering, Willendorf in der Wachau
 Albrechtsberg an der Großen Krems
 Albrechtsberg an der Großen Krems, Arzwiesen, Attenreith, Els, Eppenberg, Gillaus, Harrau, Klein-Heinrichschlag, Marbach an der Kleinen Krems, Purkersdorf
 Bergern im Dunkelsteinerwald
 Geyersberg, Maria Langegg, Nesselstauden, Oberbergern, Paltmühl, Plaimberg, Scheiblwies, Schenkenbrunn, Unterbergern, Wolfenreith
 Droß
 Droß, Droßeramt
 Dürnstein
 Dürnstein, Dürnsteiner Waldhütten, Oberloiben, Rothenhof, Unterloiben
 Furth bei Göttweig
 Aigen, Furth bei Göttweig, Klein-Wien, Oberfucha, Palt, Steinaweg, Stift Göttweig
Gedersdorf
 Altweidling, Brunn im Felde, Donaudorf, Gedersdorf, Schlickendorf, Stratzdorf, Theiß
 Gföhl
 Felling, Garmanns, Gföhl, Gföhleramt, Großmotten, Grottendorf, Hohenstein, Lengenfelderamt, Litschgraben, Mittelbergeramt, Moritzreith, Neubau, Ober-Meisling, Rastbach, Reisling, Reittern, Seeb, Unter-Meisling, Wurfenthalgraben
 Grafenegg
 Diendorf am Kamp, Engabrunn, Etsdorf am Kamp, Grafenegg, Grunddorf, Haitzendorf, Kamp, Sittendorf, Walkersdorf am Kamp
 Hadersdorf-Kammern
 Hadersdorf am Kamp, Kammern
 Jaidhof
 Eisenbergeramt, Eisengraben, Eisengraberamt, Jaidhof, Schiltingeramt, Schiltingeramt
 Krumau am Kamp
 Eisenberg, Idolsberg, Krumau am Kamp, Krumauer Waldhütten, Preinreichs, Thurnberg, Tiefenbach, Unterdobrawaldhütten
 Langenlois
 Gobelsburg, Langenlois, Mittelberg, Reith, Schiltern, Zeiselberg, Zöbing
 Lengenfeld
 Lichtenau im Waldviertel
 Allentsgschwendt, Brunn am Wald, Ebergersch, Engelschalks, Erdweis, Gloden, Großreinprechts, Jeitendorf, Kornberg, Ladings, Lichtenau, Loiwein, Obergrünbach, Pallweis, Scheutz, Taubitz, Wietzen, Wurschenaigen
 Maria Laach am Jauerling
 Benking, Felbring, Friedersdorf, Gießhübl, Haslarn, Hinterkogel, Hof, Kuffarn, Litzendorf, Loitzendorf, Maria Laach am Jauerling, Mitterndorf, Nonnersdorf, Oberndorf, Schlaubing, Thalham, Weinberg, Wiesmannsreith, Zeißing, Zintring
 Mautern an der Donau
 Baumgarten, Hundsheim, Mautern an der Donau, Mauternbach
 Mühldorf
 Amstall, Elsarn am Jauerling, Mühldorf, Niederranna, Oberranna, Ötz, Ötzbach, Povat, Trandorf
 Paudorf
 Eggendorf, Höbenbach, Hörfarth, Krustetten, Meidling, Paudorf, Tiefenfucha
 Rastenfeld
 Marbach im Felde, Mottingeramt, Niedergrünbach, Ottenstein, Peygarten-Ottenstein, Rastenberg, Rastenfeld, Sperkental, Zierings
 Rohrendorf bei Krems
 Neustift an der Donau, Neuweidling, Oberrohrendorf, Unterrohrendorf
 Rossatz-Arnsdorf
 Bacharnsdorf, Hofarnsdorf, Mitterarnsdorf, Oberarnsdorf, Rossatz, Rossatzbach, Rührsdorf, St. Johann im Mauerthale, St. Lorenz
 Sankt Leonhard am Hornerwald
 Obertautendorferamt, St. Leonhard am Hornerwald, Untertautendorferamt, Wilhalm, Wolfshoferamt
 Schönberg am Kamp
 Altenhof, Buchberger Waldhütten, Fernitz, Freischling, Kriegenreith, Mollands, Oberplank, Plank am Kamp, Raan, Schönberg, Schönberg-Neustift, See, Stiefern, Thürneustift
 Senftenberg
 Imbach, Meislingeramt, Priel, Reichaueramt, Senftenberg, Senftenbergeramt
 Spitz
 Gut am Steg, Schwallenbach, Spitz, Vießling
 Straß im Straßertale
 Diendorf am Walde, Elsarn im Straßertal, Obernholz, Straß im Straßertale, Wiedendorf
 Stratzing
 Weinzierl am Walde
 Großheinrichschlag, Habruck, Himberg, Lobendorf, Maigen, Neusiedl, Nöhagen, Ostra, Reichau, Stixendorf, Weinzierl am Walde, Wolfenreith
 Weißenkirchen in der Wachau
 Joching, St. Michael, Weißenkirchen in der Wachau, Wösendorf in der Wachau

 
Districts of Lower Austria